Muzaffar Hussain may mean the following:

 Fidai Khan Koka (real name Muzaffar Hussain), Governor of Lahore, Pakistan
 Muzaffar Hussain Baig, former deputy chief minister of Indian state of Jammu and Kashmir
 Muzaffar Hussain Shah, Pakistani politician
 Mulla Muzaffar Hussain Kashani, Iranian philosopher and poet 
 Muzaffer Hussain, Indian writer, journalist and columnist